Juan Gurrea or Giovanni Gorrea (1540–1606) was a Roman Catholic prelate who served as Bishop of Acerra (1603–1606).

Biography
Juan Gurrea was born in Zaragoza, Spain in 1540.
On 23 June 1603, he was appointed during the papacy of Pope Clement VIII as Bishop of Acerra.
He served as Bishop of Acerra until his death in 1606.

References

External links and additional sources
 (for Chronology of Bishops) 
 (for Chronology of Bishops) 

17th-century Italian Roman Catholic bishops
Bishops appointed by Pope Clement VIII
1540 births
1606 deaths